Bhandara District (Marathi pronunciation: [bʰəɳɖaːɾa]) is an administrative district in the state of Maharashtra in India. The district headquarters are located at Bhandara. The district occupies an area of 3717 km2 and has a population of 1,200,334 (605,520 males and 594,814 females), of which 19.48% are urban as of 2011.
The growth rate of Bhandara is 5.56%  Bhandara has a mixed economy with agriculture, industries and forest resources. Bhandara is known for its large production of rice. Tumsar, a tahsil town, is a noted rice market. Bhandara town is also known as "Brass City" owing to the presence of a large brass products industry. Bhandara has several tourist destinations, like Ambagad Fort, Brahmi, Chinchgad, and Dighori.

The district is also known for the Ordnance Factory Bhandara of the Ordnance Factories Board, which manufactures products for the Indian Armed Forces. It is located on an estate which is commonly known as Jawaharnagar colony. This is the only Kendriya Vidyalaya in the Bhandara district. Ashok Leyland, a Hinduja Group Company, has a production facility at Gadegaon near Bhandara. Sunflag Iron Steel company and Shivmangal Ispat Pvt. Ltd. are other major industrial undertakings in the district.

Officer

Members of Parliament
Sunil Baburao Mendhe (BJP)

Guardian Minister

list of Guardian Minister

District Magistrate/Collector

list of District Magistrate / Collector

History
In the seventh century, the district was included in the territories of the Haihaya yadav kings of Chhattisgarh, whose kingdom was known as Maha Kosala. The name of the district is derived from 'Bhannara', the name by which it is mentioned in a stone inscription at Ratanpur, which confirms that the name dates back to at least the 11th century. Formerly a part of the territories of the Haihaya Rajput kings of Chhattisgarh, Bhandara was taken over by the Panwar rajput in the 12th century, followed by the Gond chiefs.

By the 17th century, the district was made a part of Berar by Peshwas, who had invaded the region during the period. In 1699, the region came under the control of Parasoji Bhonsle along with the territories of Vidarbha and Berar. Raghoji Bhonsle of Vidarbha became the leader in 1743, and was succeeded by his son Janoji after his death in 1755. The feudal dynasty of Lanji governed the region from 1818 to 1830, and formed the Bhandara district in 1821.

Peshwas were ousted by Nizams during the 1850s, who ceded Berar to the British East India Company in 1903. With the re-organisation of states in 1956, Bhandara was transferred to Bombay Province from the state of Madhya Pradesh. After the formation of Maharashtra in 1960, Bhandara evolved as a district of the state. The erstwhile Bhandara district was bifurcated on 1 May 1999, and a new district, Gondia, was formed. Thus, Gondia and Bhandara came into existence.

Ambagad Fort 
This medieval period fort is situated in Tumsar, about 13 km away from Tumsar. It was constructed by Raja Khan Pathan, the subhedar of Bakht Buland Shah , the ruler of Devgadh around 1700 AD. Later it came under the possession of Raghoji I Bhonsle of Nagpur, who used it as a prison for captives. Later it was taken over by the British.

Geography
Bhandara is one of the major administrative districts in Maharashtra, and is located in the Nagpur division at 21°10'N 79°39'E. The district is enveloped by Balaghat district of Madhya Pradesh in the north and Chandrapur in the south, smallest border with Gadchiroli in the southeast while Gondia and Nagpur mark its eastern and western borders respectively. Covering an area of 3716 km2, the district of Bhandara is segregated into three sub-divisions, Bhandara, Tumsar and Sakoli, that are further divided into seven talukas. Bhandara sub-division is divided into two talukas: Bhandara and Pauni. Tumsar division have Tumsar and Mohadi. Sakoli sub-division is divided into three talukas: Sakoli, Lakhani, and Lakhandur.

Demographics

According to the 2011 census Bhandara district has a population of 1,200,334, roughly equal to the nation of Timor-Leste or the US state of Rhode Island. This gives it a ranking of 397th in India (out of a total of 640). 
Its population growth rate over the decade 2001–2011 was 5.65%. Bhandara has a sex ratio of 982 females for every 1000 males, and a literacy rate of 83.76%. 19.48% of the population lived in urban areas. Scheduled Castes and Scheduled Tribes make up 16.69% and 7.41% of the population respectively.

Religion 
According to the census of 2011, Hinduism is the predominant religion in Bhandara district. Its adherents form the majority of the total population, at 84.09%. Buddhism is the second largest religion at 12.87% . Other Indic religion like Jainism and Sikhism are at 0.08% and 0.07% respectively. Indic religions like Hinduism and Buddhism are deep rooted in every aspect of spiritual and cultural life of the majority of local people. Abrahamic religion like Islam and Christianity form 2.21% and 0.18% respectively of the total population. 0.21% people didn't state their religion in the census. Other religions are stated to be 0.30% of population.

Language and culture 

At the time of the 2011 Census of India, 93.19% of the population in the district spoke Marathi and 4.03% Hindi as their first language.

Marathi is the official as well as the most spoken language in the district. Bhandara city has many people from other Indian states as well as people belonging to the world's major faiths.

Politics 
There are three Vidhan Sabha constituencies in this district: Tumsar, Bhandara (SC) and Sakoli. All of these are part of the Bhandara-Gondiya Lok Sabha constituency.

Economy
Bhandara has a mixed economy including agriculture, manufacturing and forest resources. With several ancient temples and historical monuments, along with lakes, parks and sanctuaries, Bhandara attracts many tourists.

In 2006 the Ministry of Panchayati Raj named Bhandara one of the country's 250 most backward districts (out of a total of 640). It is one of the twelve districts in Maharashtra currently receiving funds from the Backward Regions Grant Fund Programme (BRGF).

See also

Bhandara Taluka

References

External links

 Bhandara district website
 Ambagad fort

 
Districts of Maharashtra
Nagpur division
Vidarbha